Prince Ludwig Ferdinand Maria Karl Heinrich Adalbert Franz Philipp Andreas Konstantin of Bavaria (22 October 1859 – 23 November 1949) was a member of the Bavarian House of Wittelsbach and a General of Cavalry. Following his marriage to Infanta María de la Paz of Spain, he was also created an Infante of Spain.

General information
He was the eldest son of Prince Adalbert of Bavaria (1828–75) and Infanta Amalia of Spain (1834–1905). He was a paternal grandson of King Ludwig I of Bavaria and his wife Princess Therese of Saxe-Altenburg. His maternal grandparents were Infante Francisco de Paula of Spain and his wife Princess Luisa Carlotta of Bourbon-Two Sicilies.

Ludwig Ferdinand's paternal uncles were King Maximilian II of Bavaria, King Otto I of Greece and Prince Regent Luitpold of Bavaria. His maternal uncle was King-Consort Francis of Spain (1822–1902) and maternally his first cousin was King Alfonso XII of Spain (1857–85), two years his senior. Ludwig Ferdinand was born in Madrid, but his younger siblings in Bavaria, where they had returned.

Ludwig II, Otto I and Ludwig III, Kings of Bavaria, were his first cousins. Alfonso XIII (reigned 1885–1931) was a first cousin's son.

Prince Ludwig Ferdinand was the only member of the Bavarian Royal Family who always remained on friendly terms with his cousin, King Ludwig II (with the exception of Elisabeth, Empress of Austria) – and the only cousin to ever be invited, together with his wife, at Herrenchiemsee Palace as well as for private dinners at the Munich Residence. When Ludwig II was arrested at Neuschwanstein Castle in 1886, he called Ludwig Ferdinand for help; the latter immediately intended to follow this call, but was prevented from leaving Nymphenburg Palace by his uncle Luitpold who was about to take over government as the ruling Prince Regent.

Ludwig Ferdinand was one of only a few European princes doing an ordinary job outside government or military, by working as a surgeon and gynaecologist. During World War I however he worked as head of the surgery department of the Munich military hospital, in spite of being nominal Royal colonel of the 18th Bavarian Infantry-Regiment as well as of a Prussian Dragoons regiment.

Marriage
Prince Ludwig Ferdinand of Bavaria was married in 1883 to his maternal first cousin, Infanta María de la Paz of Spain (1862–1946), the second-youngest daughter of his uncle King Francis and Queen Regnant Isabella II of Spain (reigned from 1833 up to 1868 when deposed, abdicated 1870 and died 1904) and the 845th Dame of the Royal Order of Queen Maria Luisa. The wedding took place in Madrid, during her brother Alfonso XII's reign.

In 1885 the young couple returned to Bavaria and resided chiefly in a side wing of the royal Nymphenburg Palace, left to them by Ludwig II. Later, they occupied an acquired palace in the inner city of Munich, the Palais Ludwig Ferdinand at Wittelsbacherplatz, together with Ludwig Ferdinand's brother Alfons and his family.

Ludwig Ferdinand and María de la Paz established the so-called Spanish branch of the Bavarian royal family, started with Ludwig Ferdinand's parents' marriage but strengthened by successive Spanish marriages in altogether three generations.

Children
They had the following children:

 Prince Ferdinand of Bavaria, Prince of Bavaria (1884–1958), born in Madrid and settled permanently in Spain in 1905, married Infanta Maria Teresa of Spain
 Prince Adalbert of Bavaria (1886–1970). Married Countess Augusta von Seefried auf Buttenheim and had two sons; lived in Germany.
 Princess Pilar of Bavaria (1891–1987), unmarried.

Ferdinand died in Francoist Spain, in Madrid.

Ludwig Ferdinand's sisters were Isabella, Duchess of Genoa; Elvira, Countess von Wrbna-Kaunitz-Rietberg-Questenberg und Freudenthal; and Clara, Abbess of St. Anna; and his younger brother was Prince Alphonse of Bavaria, husband of Louise of Orléans, daughter of Ferdinand, Duke of Alençon and Duchess Sophie in Bavaria. Alphonse's son Prince Joseph Clemens of Bavaria lived 1902–90 and died childless and unmarried. A daughter, Elisabeth, became Countess von Kageneck.

Honours and awards
He received the following orders and decorations:

Ancestry

References

1859 births
1949 deaths
Spanish infantes
Princes of Bavaria
House of Wittelsbach
Members of the Bavarian Reichsrat
German gynaecologists
German surgeons
Burials at St. Michael's Church, Munich
Knights of the Golden Fleece of Spain
Knights of Santiago
Grand Crosses of the Order of the Star of Romania
Knights of the Order of Saint Joseph